Durjoy Datta is an Indian author and screenwriter.

Early and personal life
Durjoy Datta was born on 7 February 1987 in Mehsana, Gujarat, in a Bengali Hindu family, and was brought up in New Delhi. He completed his schooling at the Bal Bharati Public School, Pitampura, and went on to do mechanical engineering at Delhi Technological University. He has done his post-graduation from Management Development Institute, Gurgaon and Frankfurt School of Finance & Management, Germany. In 2011, he quit his job as a marketing analyst and became a full-time writer. He is married to travel blogger and air hostess, Avantika Mohan.

Career
Durjoy Datta's first novel, Of Course I Love You! (co-authored with Maanvi Ahuja) was released by Srishti Publishers in 2008 while he was still in college. In August 2009, his second novel, Now That You're Rich!, was released. In the summer of 2010, his third novel, She Broke Up, I Didn't!, released. His fourth novel, Ohh Yes, I Am Single!, was co-written with Neeti Rustagi.
After graduating from MDI, Gurgaon, in 2011, he co-founded Grapevine India Publishers. His fifth novel, You Were My Crush!, was published by Grapevine India Publishers in September 2011. If It's Not Forever!, his sixth novel, was released on 1 February 2012. In the same year, Till the Last Breath... was published. On 4 February 2013, Someone Like You, a novel he co-wrote with Nikita Singh, was released by Penguin India. His ninth novel Hold My Hand released on 5 August 2013. His tenth novel When Only Love Remains was published on 19 June 2014. His eleventh novel World's ̷Best Boyfriend was published on 24 April 2015. His twelfth novel, Our Impossible Love and thirteenth novel, The Girl of my Dreams were published in 2016. He has co-authored books with Maanvi Ahuja, Neeti Rustagi, Orvana Ghai and Nikita Singh. He has also hosted TEDx talks and conferences in colleges, and has written blogs for Miss Malini and That's So Gloss.

He was listed among young achievers in Media and Communications by Whistling Woods International in 2011. His debut show Sadda Haq – My Life, My Choice won the Youth Show – fiction category at Zee Gold Awards in 2014 and at Indian Telly Awards in 2014 and 2015.

Works

Novels
 Of Course I Love You..!...Till I Find Someone Better (co-author Maanvi Ahuja) (2008)
 Now That You're Rich!  Lets Fall in Love! (co-author Maanvi Ahuja) (2009)
 SHE BROKE UP I DIDN'T! ... I Just Kissed Someone Else! (2010)
 Ohh Yes, I'm Single..! And So is My Girlfriend! (co-author Neeti Rustagi) (2010)
 The Backbenchers series (contributor) (the first book of the series was published in 2011)
 You Were My Crush! ... till you said you love me! (co-author Orvana Ghai) (2011)
 If It's Not Forever ... It's Not Love (co-author Nikita Singh) (2012)
 Till The Last Breath ... (2012)
 Someone Like You (co-author Nikita Singh) (2013)
 Hold My Hand (2013)
 When Only Love Remains (2014)
 World's Best Boyfriend (2015)
 Our Impossible Love (2016).
 The Girl of my Dreams (2016).
 The Boy who Loved (2017)
 The Boy with A Broken Heart (2017)
The Perfect Us (2018)
Pocketful Of Stories (2019)
Wish I Could Tell You (2019)
A Touch of Eternity (2021)
When I am With you (2022)

Short stories
 The English Teacher (2012)
 Shades of Love (contributor) (2012)

Television shows
 Ek Veer Ki Ardaas...Veera (co-writer Sumrit Shahi) (2012–2015)
 Sadda Haq – My Life, My Choice (co-writer Sumrit Shahi) (2013–2016)
 Million Dollar Girl – From Banaras to Paris (co-writer Sumrit Shahi) (2014–2015)
 Kuch Rang Pyar Ke Aise Bhi [Screenplay writer (co-writer Raghuvir Shekhawat)] (2016–2017)
Never Kiss Your Best Friend [Screenplay writer] (2020)

Awards and recognition
2009 Young Achiever by The Times of India
2011 Young Achievers in the field of Media and Communications by Whistling Woods International 
2014 Youth Show in the fiction category for Sadda Haq 
2015 Youth Show in the fiction category for Sadda Haq 
2017 Crossword Book Award, Popular Choice Award, fiction, for Our Impossible Love
2018 Crossword Book Award, Popular Choice Award, fiction, for The Boy Who Loved

See also
 List of Indian writers

References
 
http://www.bollywoodshaadis.com/articles/author-durjoy-datta-and-his-wife-avantika-mohan-share-their-unheard-love-story-6363

External links
 Grapevine India Publishers
 Work Summary
 Listed as one Top 10 Indian Authors

See also
 Anuj Tiwari

English-language writers from India
1987 births
Living people
Delhi Technological University alumni
 21st-century Indian novelists